Michael Heller (born May 11, 1937), is an American poet, essayist and critic. Among his many books are Exigent Futures, In The Builded Place, Wordflow and Living Root: A Memoir. He wrote the libretto for the opera, Benjamin, based on the life of Walter Benjamin. He is recipient of awards including the NEH Poet/Scholar grant, New York Foundation for the Arts Fellowship (NYFA), National Endowment for the Humanities award, and The Fund for Poetry.

Overview
Heller is recognized as a leading expert on Objectivist poets, poetry, and poetics. The impetus for his continued interest in this particular group of poets began with Heller's discovery of the poetry of George Oppen (and with whom he began a correspondence in the 1960s). Today he is acknowledged by some readers and critics as a Jewish Objectivist poet in the tradition of Oppen, Charles Reznikoff, Carl Rakosi, and Louis Zukofsky. His critical book on the Objectivist poets, Conviction’s Net of Branches, received the Di Castagnola Prize from the Poetry Society of America.

Life and work
Throughout his career, Michael Heller has addressed contemporary avant-garde movements, Jewish and post-Holocaust poetry, poetics, and the literary environment of contemporary poetry. His is a style and gesture seen as joining personal tone with historic incident while reflecting on such themes as the nature of language, poetry, religion, and even memory itself. Heller's interests often point to a succession of American poetry that today is, for the most part, inflected by the American experimentalism of Walt Whitman and the "make it new" of innovators such as Pound and Williams along with infusions of European dada, surrealism, structuralist and post-structuralist thought.

"Aspects of Poetics," an important statement by Heller on his aesthetics, appeared in Samizdat in 2001.

A recent book of essays, Uncertain Poetries (2005), deals with the uncertain nature of twentieth-century poetry. In his preface to the volume, Heller refers to these pieces as "selected from nearly twenty-five years of work (and) ought to be read as something of an intellectual biography of a working poet". They address Heller's on-going dialogue and confrontation with such major figures as Williams, Pound, Stevens, Marianne Moore, George Oppen, Robert Duncan, Lorine Niedecker, Lorca, Rilke, and Mallarmé, along with poets in more contemporary modernist and postmodernist lineages.

Heller himself notes that:

If the concepts of uncertainty, disease, and anomie embody the condition of modernity itself ---as critics have also noted--- they also animate Heller's work. Concurrently, various commentators now recognize Heller's contribution to our understanding of how, although the poet embodies the exigencies of modernity, so to the poetic act can become an active shaping force which, through the charged field of poetic language, provides the hope of meaning for both history and experience.

Selected publications
Accidental Center (Sumac Press, 1972); poetry 
Knowledge (1980); poetry 
Conviction's Net of Branches: Essays on the Objectivist Poets and Poetry (Southern Illinois University Press, 1985); criticism 
In the Builded Place (Coffee House Press, 1989); poetry 
Carl Rakosi: Man and Poet (Orono, ME: National Poetry Foundation, 1993); Heller is editor of this volume on the renowned Objectivist poet 
Wordflow: New and Selected Poems (Talisman House, 1997); poetry 
Living Root: A Memoir (SUNY Press, 2000); memoir of his youth in Brooklyn and Miami Beach, FL, that mixes in history regarding his family's hometown of Bialystock, Poland, and World War II 
Exigent Futures: New and Selected Poems (Salt Publishing, 2003); poetry: gathers together poems from four of his major collections 
Uncertain Poetries : Selected Essays on Poets, Poetry and Poetics (Salt Publishing, 2005); essays
Earth and Cave, (Loveland, OH: Dos Madres Press, 2006) 
A Look at the Door with the Hinges Off, (Loveland, OH: Dos Madres Press, 2006) 
Speaking the Estranged: Essays on the Work of George Oppen, (Cambridge UK: Salt Publishing, 2008); essay/memoir
Eschaton, (Jersey City, NJ: Talisman House, 2009)
Telescope: Selected Poems, (New York, NY: NYRB Poets, 2019)

References

External links
Interview with Heller in September 1998 
Patrick Pritchett reviews Exigent Futures at Jacket Magazine website 
Jon Curley reviews Uncertain Poetries at Jacket Magazine website 
UtopocalypticMoments: Objectivist Poetics, a talk by Michael Heller a talk by Heller at Small Press Traffic on March 20, 1998 
Will to Exchange: Heller Interviewed by Thomas Fink in January 2006 
"Michael Heller, featured poet" in Sugar Mule magazine website, selected poetry and biographical notes in SugarMule.com, issue #50, 2016.

American male poets
Living people
1937 births
Objectivist poets